Gerald Michael McGrath (born 28 November 1947) is an Australian former triple jumper who competed in the 1970 Commonwealth Games and the 1972 Summer Olympics.

He attended the University of Melbourne, gaining a full blue in athletics in 1969. In 2014 he was named by Athletics Victoria in the Victorian all-time Commonwealth Games team.

References

1947 births
Living people
Australian male triple jumpers
Olympic athletes of Australia
Athletes (track and field) at the 1970 British Commonwealth Games
Athletes (track and field) at the 1972 Summer Olympics
Athletes (track and field) at the 1974 British Commonwealth Games
Commonwealth Games medallists in athletics
Commonwealth Games silver medallists for Australia
20th-century Australian people
21st-century Australian people
Medallists at the 1970 British Commonwealth Games